Alessandro D'Addario (born 9 September 1997) is a Sammarinese footballer who plays for club San Marino and the San Marino national football team.

References

1997 births
Living people
Sammarinese footballers
San Marino international footballers
U.S. Pianese players
Rimini F.C. 1912 players
Campionato Sammarinese di Calcio players
A.S.D. Victor San Marino players
Serie D players
Association football midfielders
Sammarinese expatriate footballers
Expatriate footballers in Italy